Zuriko Davitashvili (born 15 February 2001) is a Georgian professional footballer who plays as a left winger for  club Bordeaux, on loan from Erovnuli Liga club Dinamo Batumi, and the Georgia national team. He also plays as an attacking midfielder.

Club career

Early career 
Davitashvili made his career debut for Dinamo Tbilisi on 29 September 2017 in a match against Kolkheti Poti. He came on the pitch in the 72nd minute. 

In 2018, he moved to Locomotive Tbilisi. In the same year The Guardian named Davitashvili among 60 best young players worldwide.

As a distinguished player of the Georgian U17 team, he received a golden medal from the Football Federation. Тhis acknowledgement resulted from his highly prolific performance in two qualifying rounds of 2018 European U17 championship. Being captain of the team, he scored seven goals in six matches, including a poker against N.Macedonia.    

A year later he was named as the best young Georgian football player of the season.

Russia 
On 29 June 2019, Davitashvili signed a three-year contract with Russian Premier League club Rubin Kazan. He made his Russian Premier League debut for Rubin on 15 July 2019 in the season opener against Lokomotiv Moscow, as a starter.

UEFA included Zuriko Davitashvili in the list of fifty young talents in early 2020. 

On 20 August 2020, Davitashvili joined Rotor Volgograd on loan for the 2020–21 season. On 16 July 2021, his contract with Rubin was terminated by mutual consent. Four days later, he signed for Arsenal Tula.

Return to Georgia 
On 23 March 2022, Davitashvili signed with Dinamo Batumi. After the 2022 Russian invasion of Ukraine, FIFA gave foreign players playing in Russia the permission to terminate their contract immediately.

Loan to Bordeaux  
On 2 September 2022 Davitashvili moved to Bordeaux on a one-year loan deal. His goal in a debut game helped his new club to secure victory over Dijon on 17 September.

International career 
Before 2016, Davitashvili played for the Georgia under-17s. After 2017, he played for the Georgia under-19s. He made his debut for Georgia national team on 5 September 2019 in a friendly against South Korea, as a starter. Three days later in a friendly game against Bulgaria he netted his first goal.

Career statistics

International goals
Scores and results list Georgia's goal tally first, score column indicates score after each Davitashvili goal.

Honours 
Georgia U17
 Kazakhstan President Cup runner-up: 2017
Individual
 Kazakhstan President Cup top scorer: 2017

 Best Georgian young player: 2019

References

External links 
 
 profile
 
 
 

2001 births
Footballers from Tbilisi
Living people
Footballers from Georgia (country)
Georgia (country) youth international footballers
Georgia (country) under-21 international footballers
Georgia (country) international footballers
Association football midfielders
FC Dinamo Tbilisi players
FC Lokomotivi Tbilisi players
FC Rubin Kazan players
FC Rotor Volgograd players
FC Arsenal Tula players
FC Dinamo Batumi players
FC Girondins de Bordeaux players
Erovnuli Liga players
Russian Premier League players
Ligue 2 players
Expatriate footballers from Georgia (country)
Expatriate footballers in Russia
Expatriate sportspeople from Georgia (country) in Russia
Expatriate footballers in France
Expatriate sportspeople from Georgia (country) in France